Glenda Arentzen (born 1941) is an American jeweler, goldsmith, and educator. In 2008, Arentzen was elected a Fellow of the American Craft Council (ACC).

Biography 
Glenda Arentzen was born in 1941 in Ridgewood, New Jersey. She attended Skidmore College (BS degree, 1962) and Teachers College, Columbia University (MA degree, 1964). Arentzen also studied in Denmark as a Fulbright scholar in metalworking. Early in her career, she worked as a studio assistant for Adda Husted-Andersen, who also served as a mentor and introduced her to working with gemstones. In the 1960s, she learned about a layering metals technique from Robert Ebendorf.

Arentzen taught at Fashion Institute of Technology (FIT) for many years. Jeweler Anne Behrsing served an as apprentice under Arentzen.

Arentzen's work is included in public museum collections, including the Museum of Fine Arts, Houston, Museum of Fine Arts, Boston, and others.

References

External links 
 Oral history interview with Glenda Arentzen, 2012 November 12-13 from Archives of American Art, Smithsonian Institution

1941 births
Living people
People from Ridgewood, New Jersey
Skidmore College alumni
Teachers College, Columbia University alumni
Fashion Institute of Technology faculty
American women artists
American jewelry designers
21st-century American women
Women jewellers